Marie Johannes Jacobus (Miel or Joop) Campioni (4 August 1901, Roermond - 4 January 1962, Amstelveen) was a Dutch football player, who played for HVV Den Haag.

International career
He made his debut for the Netherlands national football team on 26 March 1921, in the home game against Switzerland (2-0 victory), at the age of 19 years and 234 days. Campioni also played with the Netherlands against Italy on 8 May 1921 (2-2 draw), his second and final cap.

References

1901 births
1962 deaths
People from Roermond
Dutch footballers
Netherlands international footballers
Association football midfielders
Footballers from Limburg (Netherlands)